Denisa D. Wagner is an American scientist currently the Edwin Cohn Professor of Pediatrics at Boston Children's Hospital (BCH), Harvard Medical School. Wagner first arrived in the United States in 1975 as a refugee from Czechoslovakia. She received her PhD in Biology from the Massachusetts Institute of Technology and taught at the University of Rochester and Tufts University before joining the Harvard faculty in 1994.The Wagner Lab contributes in the fields of vascular biology, inflammation, and thrombosis. Her Lab focuses on how blood cells and endothelial cells respond to vascular injury. Also her lab has been studying NETs (Neutrophil Extracellular Traps) for more than a decade. In 2015, research from the lab shed light on healing wounds in patients with diabetes. In the same year she received the Robert P. Grant Medal, which is the highest award of the International Society on Thrombosis and Hemostasis (ISTH). 

Wagner is an Elected Fellow of the American Association for the Advancement of Science. In 2017 the American Heart Association honored her as one of the year's Distinguished Scientists and in 2021, she delivered the Russell Ross Memorial Lectureship in Vascular Biology. In 2021, Wagner received the prestigious Henry B. Stratton Medal in Basic Science from the American Society of Hematology. Dr. Wagner is widely published, with more than 50,000 citations and an h-index of 129. 

For further information, please see the 2018 biographical piece in the American Heart Association Journal, Circulation Research, "The Road to Success Might Not be Direct"

References

External links
Wagner DD, Heger LA. Thromboinflammation: From Atherosclerosis to COVID-19. Arterioscler Thromb Vasc Biol. 2022 Sep;42(9):1103-1112. doi: 10.1161/ATVBAHA.122.317162. Epub 2022 Jul 8. PMID: 35861953; PMCID: PMC9420806.

Year of birth missing (living people)
American women biologists
American scientists
Fellows of the American Association for the Advancement of Science
MIT School of Engineering alumni
Living people
21st-century American women